National Route 152 is a national highway of Japan connecting Ueda, Nagano and Higashi-ku, Hamamatsu in Japan, with a total length of .

See also

References

152
Roads in Nagano Prefecture
Roads in Shizuoka Prefecture